Oakwood is a village in Clay County, Missouri, United States. The population was 198 at the 2020 census. It is part of the Kansas City metropolitan area.

Oakwood was laid out in the early 1920s, and named for a grove of oak trees near the original town site.

Geography

Demographics

2010 census
As of the census of 2010, there were 185 people, 78 households, and 58 families living in the village. The racial makeup of the village was 97.3% White, 1.6% Native American, and 1.1% from other races. Hispanic or Latino of any race were 5.9% of the population.

There were 78 households, of which 17.9% had children under the age of 18 living with them, 70.5% were married couples living together, 1.3% had a female householder with no husband present, 2.6% had a male householder with no wife present, and 25.6% were non-families. 24.4% of all households were made up of individuals, and 10.3% had someone living alone who was 65 years of age or older. The average household size was 2.37 and the average family size was 2.79.

The median age in the village was 55.6 years. 17.3% of residents were under the age of 18; 3.3% were between the ages of 18 and 24; 11.4% were from 25 to 44; 40.1% were from 45 to 64; and 28.1% were 65 years of age or older. The gender makeup of the village was 50.8% male and 49.2% female.

2000 census
As of the census of 2000, there were 197 people, 75 households, and 71 families living in the village. The population density was 989.5 people per square mile (380.3/km). There were 78 housing units at an average density of 391.8 per square mile (150.6/km). The racial makeup of the village was 97.46% White, 0.51% Native American, 1.52% Asian, 0.51% from other races. Hispanic or Latino of any race were 3.05% of the population.

There were 75 households, out of which 25.3% had children under the age of 18 living with them, 89.3% were married couples living together, 4.0% had a female householder with no husband present, and 5.3% were non-families. 5.3% of all households were made up of individuals, and 1.3% had someone living alone who was 65 years of age or older. The average household size was 2.63 and the average family size was 2.72.

In the village, the population was spread out, with 20.3% under the age of 18, 4.6% from 18 to 24, 15.7% from 25 to 44, 35.0% from 45 to 64, and 24.4% who were 65 years of age or older. The median age was 50 years. For every 100 females, there were 107.4 males. For every 100 females age 18 and over, there were 98.7 males.

The median income for a household in the village was $81,412, and the median income for a family was $83,387. Males had a median income of $56,250 versus $36,750 for females. The per capita income for the village was $35,242. None of the population or families were below the poverty line.

Education
North Kansas City School District is the area school district. It is zoned to Oakwood Manor Elementary School in Gladstone, Antioch Middle School in Gladstone, and Oak Park High School in Kansas City.

References

Villages in Clay County, Missouri
Villages in Missouri